"You Don't Know Me" is a song written by Eddy Arnold and Cindy Walker in 1955. "You Don't Know Me" was first recorded by Arnold that year and released as a single on April 21, 1956, on RCA Victor. The best-selling version of the song is by Ray Charles, who took it to number 2 on the Billboard Hot 100 chart in 1962, after releasing the song on his number 1 album Modern Sounds in Country and Western Music. The first version of the song to make the Billboard charts was by Jerry Vale in 1956, peaking at number 14 on the pop chart. Arnold's version charted two months later, released as an RCA Victor single, 47–6502, backed with "The Rockin' Mockin' Bird", which reached number 10 on the Billboard country chart. Cash Box magazine, which combined all best-selling versions at one position, included a version by Carmen McRae that never appeared in the Billboard Top 100 Sides listing.

Origin
In his book Eddy Arnold: Pioneer of the Nashville Sound, author Michael Streissguth describes how Arnold and Walker composed the song:

Cindy Walker, who had supplied Eddy with "Take Me in Your Arms and Hold Me" (a number-one country record in 1949 and Eddy's first Cindy Walker release), recalled discussing the idea for "You Don't Know Me" with Eddy as she was leaving one of Nashville's annual disc-jockey conventions. "I went up to the Victor suite to tell Steve Sholes good-bye," she explained, "and just as I was leaving, Eddy came in the door." Arnold approached Walker with the title of the song: "I got a song title for you... 'You Don't Know Me.'" Walker, in jest, replied "But I know you!" to which Arnold retorted he was serious and proceeded to outline the story he had in mind. Walker promised to take Arnold's story and think about how to turn it into workable lyrics and melody, which eventually came naturally. "The song just started singing. It sort of wrote itself..."

The song, in a basic thirty-two-bar form, tells a narrative of a man, who has "never (known) the art of making love," and his friendly encounter with someone he knows but secretly loves—fearing rejection, the narrator never expresses his feelings toward the object of his affections and lets her walk away with another "lucky guy" (this lyric is gender-neutralized when sung by a woman), never knowing if she loves him back.

Notable recorded versions

The best-selling version of the song is by Ray Charles, who took it to number 2 on the Billboard Hot 100 chart in September 1962, after releasing the song on his number 1 album Modern Sounds in Country and Western Music. It was the follow-up single to "I Can't Stop Loving You", which held the number 1 position for five weeks. After being released in July, it was kept from the number 1 spot by "Sheila" by Tommy Roe.  This version also topped the Easy Listening chart for three weeks in 1962 and was used in the 1993 comedy film Groundhog Day. The song was the 12th number one country hit for Mickey Gilley in 1981.

The song has been performed or recorded by hundreds of artists, including Elvis Presley, Bob Dylan, and Willie Nelson. Charles re-recorded the song with Diana Krall on his number 1 album of duets, Genius Loves Company, the only song common to both of Charles' two number 1 albums. It was sung by Meryl Streep in the 1990 film Postcards from the Edge, by John Legend in the 2007 Curb Your Enthusiasm episode "The Bat Mitzvah", by Robert Downey Jr. in the 1998 film Two Girls and a Guy, and by Lizzy Caplan.

Artists that released versions of the song:

Eddy Arnold (1955)
Jerry Vale (1956)
Jeanne Black (1960)
Lenny Welch (1960)
Patti Page (1961) on album Somethin' Country
The Anita Kerr Singers (1962) on album  From Nashville The Hit Sound 
Ray Charles (1962) on album Modern Sounds in Country and Western Music 
Floyd Cramer (1964) on album Country Piano-City Strings
Manfred Mann (1965) on album Mann Made
Rick Nelson (1965) on album Best Always
Jackie Wilson (1965) on album Spotlight on Jackie Wilson!
Jan Howard (1967) on album This Is Jan Howard Country
Elvis Presley (1967) on album Clambake
Ray Pennington (1970) on album Sings for the Other Woman
Roy Orbison (1973) on album Milestones
Steve Marriott (1976) on album Marriott
Bette Midler  (1977) on album Broken Blossom
Kenny Loggins (1977) on album Celebrate Me Home
Mickey Gilley (1981) on album You Don't Know Me
Juice Newton (1984) on album Can't Wait All Night
Richard Manuel (1985) on album Whispering Pines: Live at the Getaway
Bob James and David Sanborn (1986) on album Double Vision
The Heptones (1986) on album Changing Times
Don McLean (1989) on album For the Memories Vols I & II
Marc Hunter (1989) on album Night and Day
Israel Kamakawiwo'ole (1990) on album Ka 'Ano'i
Charlie Rich (1992) on album Pictures and Paintings
Emmylou Harris (1993) on album Cowgirl's Prayer
Allen Toussaint (1994) on album Bluesiana Hot Sauce
Diane Schuur and B.B. King (1994) on album Heart to Heart
World Saxophone Quartet with Fontella Bass (1994) on album Breath of Life
Van Morrison (1995) on album Days Like This (duet with his daughter Shana Morrison)
David Sanborn (1995) on album Love Songs
Jann Arden (1997) for the soundtrack of My Best Friend's Wedding
Steven Houghton (1997) on album Steven Houghton
Roseanna Vitro (1997) on album Catchin' Some Rays: The Music of Ray Charles
Kenny Rogers (1999) on album After Dark
Patricia Barber (2000) on album Nightclub
Jennifer Warnes (2001) with Doyle Bramhall on album The Well
Anne Murray (2002) on album Country Croonin'
Michael Bolton (2003) on album Vintage
Janis Siegel (2003) on album Friday Night Special
Ray Charles and Diana Krall (2004) on album Genius Loves Company
Harry Connick Jr (2004) on album Only You
Peter Cincotti (2004) on album On the Moon
Sarah Geronimo (2004) on album Sweet Sixteen
Michael Bublé (2005) on album It's Time
John Scofield (2005) with Aaron Neville on album That's What I Say: John Scofield Plays the Music of Ray Charles
Willie Nelson (2006) on album You Don't Know Me: The Songs of Cindy Walker
Russell Watson (2007) on album That's Life
Leon Jackson (2008) on album Right Now
Michael McDonald (2008) on album Soul Speak
Gina Jeffreys (2010) on album, Old Paint
Michael Grimm (2011) on album Michael Grimm
Anna Wilson and Matt Giraud (2011) on album Countrypolitan Duets
Lulu Roman (2013) on album At Last
Michael Geier (2013) 
Ronnie Dunn (2014) on album Peace, Love, and Country Music
Alison Krauss (2017) on album Windy City
Crystal Gayle (2019) on album You Don't Know Me
Ray Stevens (2021) on album Nouveau Retro

Charts

Eddy Arnold

Jerry Vale

Lenny Welch

Ray Charles

Elvis Presley

Ray Pennington

Mickey Gilley

References

External links
 Eddy Arnold: Pioneer of the Nashville Sound

1955 songs
1962 singles
1981 singles
Songs written by Cindy Walker
Songs written by Eddy Arnold
Eddy Arnold songs
Ray Charles songs
Mickey Gilley songs
Van Morrison songs
Willie Nelson songs
Jerry Vale songs
Elvis Presley songs
Eva Cassidy songs
RCA Victor singles
Epic Records singles
Torch songs
Harry Connick Jr. songs
1950s ballads